Masood Ahmed Barkati (15 August 1933 – 10 December 2017) was a Pakistani writer and editor who was known as the editor of Hamdard Naunihal and Monthly Hamdard-e-Sehat Karachi.

Early life
Masood Ahmed Barkati was born on 15 August 1933, in Tonk, current-day Rajasthan, India. His grandfather, Hakim Syed Barkaat Ahmed, was a renowned physician and religious scholar in the state of Rajasthan. His father, Hakim Mohammad Ahmed, was also an Unani medicine physician. Barkati's father died when he was hardly 2 years old. He got his earlier education from Darul Uloom Al-Khaliliah.
After partition of India in 1947, Barkati migrated alone to Pakistan while his family was still in India. Later, his elder Hakim Mehmood Akhtar Barkati brother also came to Pakistan. In the beginning, he used to be a private tutor for a living in Hyderabad, Sindh.

Career as writer and editor
Barkati had a passion for writing since his childhood and started a penned journal, "Al Bakaat", at the name of his grandfather when he was still a school-going student. When he came to Pakistan, he wrote his first article, "Ishtrakiyat Kiya Hai?" (What is Communism?) in 1951 for an Urdu journal and after being encouraged by the editor, he wrote many articles on the subject of Communism, religion, and class system.
Barkati's writing career took a turn when he met Hakeem Muhammad Saeed who recruited him as a staff member in Hamdard Foundation. Later, when Hakim Saeed issued a journal for children, "Hamdard Naunihal" in 1953, he appointed Barkati as its first editor. Barkati was also editor of another health journal, "Hamdard-e-Sehat", issued under the supervision of Hakim Saeed. Barkati performed his editorial duties for both journals for the next 65 years. Barkati also served as co-editor of "Payami", an Urdu edition of UNESCO courier.
Apart from writing children stories, Barkati also wrote several books for adults on the subjects of health, wellness, and time-management.

Personal life
Barkati married in mid-1950s. He had three daughters and a son.

Books
 Do Musafir, Do Mulak (Urdu travelogue)
 Johar-e-Qabil
 Teen Bandoqchi (Urdu translation of "The Three Musketeers")
 Monti Kristo Ka Nawab (Urdu translation of "The Count of Monte Cristo")
 Hazaron Khwahishein
 Hakeem Saeed Ke Tibbi Mashwaray (compilation)
 Mard-e-Darvesh
 Farhang Istlahaat-e-Tibb
 Ghazayein, Dawayein
 Saeed Spon (Sindhi translation)
 Mehboob Balooch
 Profile of a Humanitarian (co-author)

Awards and recognition
The All Pakistan Newspapers Society presented Masood Ahmed Barkati with the Sapas Nama (Address of Welcome) as a senior professional editor on 2 March 1996.

Death
After a prolonged illness, Barkati died on 10 December 2017, in Karachi.

References

1933 births
2017 deaths
Urdu-language writers
Pakistani children's writers
People from Tonk district
Pakistani people of Rajasthani descent